Afif Ahmed Hamid (d. 5 September 1972) was a Palestinian terrorist and one of eight Black September terrorists that invaded the Israeli quarters at the Munich Olympic Village during the 1972 Munich Olympic Games, taking hostage nine members of the Israeli Olympic delegation after killing Israeli wrestling coach Moshe Weinberg and weightlifter Yossef Romano in the initial takeover.

Early life
Like several of the younger fedayeen involved in the Munich operation, Hamid had grown up in the Chatila refugee camp in Lebanon.
He joined Fatah in 1968 and became familiar with Germany, living and studying there for over a year, before returning to Lebanon in 1971.

Preparation for the attack
Such was the secrecy behind the operation that Hamid told his family that he was returning to Germany for different reasons. He told his mother that he was going back to Germany to study, and that he would be there for approximately two and a half months.

Death at Fürstenfeldbruck Air Base
Upon arriving in one of the two helicopters with his fellow fedayeen and the Israeli athletes at Fürstenfeldbruck Air Base, the terrorists became embroiled in a firefight with five German police sharpshooters positioned around the airfield, who fired upon them. It would appear that Hamid was killed in the initial stages of the firefight. In photographs taken after the event, Hamid can be seen lying facedown on the tarmac, a large pool of blood surrounding his body. Mortuary photographs show his face with bullet wounds, as well as a knife wound on the bridge of his nose, received from hostage Yossef Romano.

Aftermath
Hamid's body and those of his four fedayeen compatriots were handed over to Libya and after a procession of 30,000 people from Tripoli's Martyrs' Square, they were buried at the Sidi Munaidess Cemetery.

See also
 Palestine Liberation Organization
 Operation Wrath of God
 List of hostage crises

References

Date of birth missing
1972 deaths
Members of the Black September Organization
Palestinian mass murderers
Palestinian terrorism
People shot dead by law enforcement officers in Germany
Islamist mass murderers
Islam and antisemitism
Islamic terrorism in Germany
Palestinian Islamists